Pasquale Viespoli (born 19 January 1955) is an Italian politician who served as Mayor of Benevento (1993–2001), Deputy (2001–2006), Undersecretary of State (2001–2006, 2008–2010) and Senator (2006–2013).

References

1955 births
Mayors of Benevento
Deputies of Legislature XIV of Italy
Senators of Legislature XV of Italy
Senators of Legislature XVI of Italy
Living people
People from Benevento
Italian Social Movement politicians
National Alliance (Italy) politicians
The People of Freedom politicians
Brothers of Italy politicians